This is a list of notable students, alumni, staff and faculty of Canisius College in Buffalo, New York.

Academia
 Sister Marion Beiter, '44 - mathematician, Chairman of Mathematics for Rosary Hill College
H. James Birx - Professor of Anthropology, Canisius College
Paul G. Bulger - President of Buffalo State College
 James Demske, S.J., B.A. '47 – President of Canisius College (1966–1993)
John Hurley - President of Canisius College
Mark Huson - Professor of Finance, University of Alberta, Faculty of Business
Paul G. Gassman '57 - former Chair of University of Minnesota Chemistry Department
Thomas J. Lawley '68 - Dean of the Emory University School of Medicine
 Steven Seegel, Ph.D. ’99 - Professor of Slavic and Eurasian Studies at University of Texas at Austin

Business
 Mary E. Belle '73 – President of Licensing, Jones Apparel Group
 Michael Buczkowski '86 - General Manager / Vice President of the Buffalo Bisons
 Peter M. Cuviello '69 – Vice President and Managing Director, Lockheed Martin
 Calvin Darden '72 – Senior Vice President, United Parcel Service; named 8th most powerful black executive in the U.S. by Fortune magazine
 Gene F. Jankowski '55 – former Chairman, CBS Broadcast Group: Chairman and CEO, Jankowski
 Gregory R. Maday '70 – Senior Vice President, Warner Bros.
 George Mathewson '72 – Chairman of the Board, Royal Bank of Scotland
 Carl J. Montante '64 - founder, President, and Managing Director of Uniland Development; named 2010 Buffalo Outstanding Citizen 
 Charles Moran Jr. - President and COO, Delaware North
 John W. Rowe '66 – Chairman and CEO, Aetna, Inc.; member of the Academy of Science

Journalism
Anne Burrell '91 – Food Network chef
J. Michael Collins – co-founder of PBS Buffalo; Emmy Award winner for executive producing Reading Rainbow
 Elizabeth MacDonald '84 - Gerald Loeb Award and multiple other awards winning financial journalist with The Wall Street Journal, anchorwoman on Fox Business, appeared on NBC's The Today Show, ABC's World News Tonight, Outnumbered, Your World with Neil Cavuto,  CBS This Morning, C-SPAN, Court TV, ABC News Radio,  NPR, and others
Michael Scheuer '74 – CBS News terrorism analyst; former CIA employee
Elaine Sciolino ’70 – author; Paris Bureau Chief for The New York Times
Cynthia L. Skrzycki '76 – financial columnist for The Washington Post
Adam Zyglis '04 – editorial cartoonist for The Buffalo News, winner of 2015 Pulitzer Prize for Editorial Cartooning

Medicine and science
 Sister Marion Beiter, '44 - mathematician, Chairman of Mathematics for Rosary Hill College
 Thomas J. Dougherty, Ph.D. '55 – Chief of Radiation/Biology Dept., Roswell Park Comprehensive Cancer Center
 Thomas J. Lawley, M.D. '68 – Dean, School of Medicine, Emory University
 Mark J. Lema, M.D., Ph.D. '71 – Chairman, Critical Care Medicine & Pain Medicine, Roswell Park Comprehensive Cancer Center
 Robert J. Lull, M.D. (deceased) '62 – Chief of Nuclear Medicine, San Francisco General Hospital
 George E. Schreiner '43 – Distinguished Professor of Medicine, Georgetown University School of Medicine
 Edward G. Zubler '49, inventor of the halogen lamp

Politics, government, and law
 Hon. Charles S. Desmond (deceased) '17 – retired Chief Judge, New York Court of Appeals
 Hon. Dennis Thomas Flynn, Delegate to Congress from the Oklahoma territory
 Hon. Matthew J. Jasen '37 – retired judge, NY State Court of Appeals; Jasen and Jasen, PC
 Hon. John J. LaFalce '61 – former Congressman (NY); Peter Canisius Distinguished University Professor, Canisius College
 Hon. Michael Liebel, Jr. (Class of 1887), former Mayor of Erie, Pennsylvania and United States Representative for Pennsylvania
 Hon. Salvatore R. Martoche, JSC '62 – New York State Supreme Court Justice; former Assistant Secretary of the Treasury
 Hon. Anthony M. Masiello '69 – former Mayor of Buffalo, New York
 James T. Molloy '58 – former Doorkeeper, U.S. House of Representatives
 Hon. Henry J. Nowak '57 – former Congressman (NY), U.S. House of Representatives
 Hon. L. William Paxon '77 – former Congressman (NY); Senior Advisor, Akin, Gump, Hauer, Strauss & Feld
 Denise O'Donnell, former United States Attorney, candidate for New York State Attorney General and New York State Director of Criminal Justice Services
 Michael Scheuer '74, Ph.D. – former Chief of the Bin Laden Issue Station (aka Alec Station); Special Advisor to the Chief of the bin Laden unit from September 2001 to November 2004; author of Imperial Hubris: Why the West is Losing the War on Terror
 Robin Schimminger '69 – State Assemblyman
 Dale Volker '63 – State Senator

Sports
Dan Carey- professional lacrosse player and now General Manager of the Rochester knight hawks 
 Michael Buczkowski - General Manager/Vice President of the Buffalo Bisons
 Tommy Colella - football player
 Leroy Chollet - basketball player
 Corey Herring '08 −  basketball player
 Robert A. MacKinnon '50 – former General Manager, Assistant Coach, New Jersey Nets
 Johnny McCarthy - NBA player and coach; coached Golden Griffins Men's Basketball
 Gerry Meehan - former NHL player and General Manager of the Buffalo Sabres
 Michael Meeks - basketball player
 Beth Phoenix − WWE professional wrestler; Class of 2017 WWE Hall of Famer, former WWE Divas Champion & three-time WWE Women's Champion
 Dick Poillon − early National Football League player
 Michael F. Smrek '85 – former professional basketball player, NBA Los Angeles Lakers
Eyal Yaffe '86 - basketball player, Israeli Basketball Premier League

References

 
Canisius College